Facundo Kidd Álvarez (born 4 August 1997) is a Uruguayan footballer who plays as a defender for Chilean Primera División side Santiago Wanderers.

References

External links

1997 births
Living people
Uruguayan people of British descent
Uruguayan footballers
Uruguayan expatriate footballers
Plaza Colonia players
Santiago Wanderers footballers
Uruguayan Primera División players
Uruguayan Segunda División players
Chilean Primera División players
Expatriate footballers in Chile
Uruguayan expatriate sportspeople in Chile
Association football defenders